Meco may refer to:

 Meco (born 1939), American record producer and musician
 Meco (municipality), a part of metropolitan Madrid, Spain

MECO may stand for:
 Mactan Electric Company
 Main engine cutoff, the shut-off of the first stage in a multistage rocket
 Magnetospheric eternally collapsing object, a theoretical alternative to a black hole
 Middle European Cooperation in Statistical Physics, an international conference on statistical physics
 Middle Eocene Climatic Optimum, a global warming period 40 million years ago, during the Eocene